The blackish rail (Pardirallus nigricans) is a species of bird in the subfamily Rallinae of the rail, crake, and coot family Rallidae. It is found in Argentina, Brazil, Colombia, Ecuador, Paraguay, Peru, Venezuela, and possibly Bolivia.

Taxonomy and systematics

The blackish rail has previously been placed in the large genus Rallus, and also in genus Orygonax with the plumbeous rail (Pardirallus sanguinolentus). Some authors propose that the blackish and plumbeous rails are conspecific, and they do form a superspecies. The blackish rail has two subspecies, the nominate P. n. nigricans and P. n. caucae.

Description

The sexes are alike. They have a long yellow-green bill and pinkish legs. The nominate subspecies has unmarked dark brown upperparts, a white chin and throat, and dark gray face and underparts. P. n. caucae is larger than the nominate and has a larger and whiter throat patch and paler underparts especially at the vent.

Distribution and habitat

The blackish rail has a disjunct distribution. The nominate subspecies has two populations. One is found from northeastern Brazil south and west to southeastern Brazil, northern Argentina, and eastern Paraguay. The other forms a rough crescent from western Brazil through central Peru and Ecuador nearly to the border with Colombia. There are also sight records in Bolivia that lead the South American Classification Committee of the American Ornithological Society to call it hypothetical in that country. Subspecies P. n. caucae is found in central Colombia (it is named for the Cauca River). The species has been documented in western Venezuela, but whether as a member of P. n. caucae or an undescribed subspecies is not known. 

The blackish rail inhabits wet landscapes including marshes, heavily vegetated waterways, rice fields, wet grasslands, and lightly wooded swamps.

Behavior

Movement

No movement by the blackish rail has been documented except for the vagrant in Peru.

Feeding

The blackish rail usually forages in cover but occasionally in the open at the edges of vegetation or in small clear areas. Its diet is not known but is assumed to be insects and other invertebrates. There is one record of an individual "venturing 5m into [a] restaurant garden for food scraps."

Breeding

The blackish rail's breeding season has not been determined. One nest of either the blackish or plumbeous rail was a cup placed among shoots on a stump in a swamp. The clutch size is two or three and the incubation time (in captivity) is 18 to 21 days. The black downy chicks leave the nest soon after they hatch, and both parents care for the chicks.

Vocalization

The blackish rail has a large vocal repertoire. What is thought to be a male song is a "very sharp, loud, penetrating, repeated 'whuueeee' or 'wheee'." Other vocalizations have been described as a "very fast, metallic 'tii'd'dit'", a "complaining 'keeeeaaa'", a "rapid, repeated 'chchchee'" and a "sharp double squeak".

Status

The IUCN has assessed the blackish rail as being of Least Concern. It has a very large range and an estimated population of up to 67,000 mature individuals. The population trend is unknown. No immediate threats have been identified. It is regarded as locally common in a few areas but generally as patchy and uncommon. Its "status [is] difficult to assess, as [the] species [is] usually secretive and difficult to observe."

References

blackish rail
Birds of South America
Birds of Colombia
Birds of Venezuela
Birds of the Amazon Basin
Birds of the Ecuadorian Amazon
Birds of the Peruvian Amazon
Birds of the Bolivian Amazon
Birds of Brazil
Birds of Paraguay
blackish rail
Taxa named by Louis Jean Pierre Vieillot
Taxonomy articles created by Polbot